José "Pepe" Alcaide Muñoz (born 8 February 1979 in Madrid) is a Spanish retired footballer who played as a right back.

External links

1979 births
Living people
Spanish footballers
Footballers from Madrid
Association football defenders
Segunda División players
Segunda División B players
Tercera División players
Real Jaén footballers
Novelda CF players
Zamora CF footballers
Logroñés CF footballers
SD Ponferradina players